SocioBranding is an approach to brand management that integrates traditional advertising creative strategy and tactics with  social networking websites, with the aim of being able to target potential customers more accurately.

References

Further reading

 Li, Charlene, Bernoff, Josh (2008). Groundswell, Winning in a world transformed by social technologies. Boston: Harvard Business
 Scoble, Robert, Israel, Shel (2006). Naked Conversations: How Blogs are changing the way businesses talk with customers. New York: Wiley & Sons
 "Marketers go 2-way with social networking". Chicago Tribune. February 3, 2009.
 Brogan, Chris, Smith, Julian (2009). Trust Agents: Using the Web to Build Influence, Improve Reputation, and Earn Trust. New York: Wiley & Sons
 Winberg, Tamar, (2009). The New Community Rules: Marketing on the Social Web. Sebastopol, Ca. O’Reilly
 Qualman, Erik, (2009). Socialnomics. New York, Wiley & Sons.
 Using Social Media as a Business Process”, Jim Stiles 
 HOW TO: Manage Social Media Goals and Expectations, Ben Parr 

Advertising
Brand management